Georgia returned to electing its members at-large for the 1828 election and elected its members October 6, 1828.  Despite two retirements, the entire delegation remained Jacksonians.

See also 
 1829 Georgia's at-large congressional district special election
 1828 and 1829 United States House of Representatives elections
 List of United States representatives from Georgia

1828
Georgia
United States House of Representatives